John Victor Evans Sr. (January 18, 1925 – July 8, 2014) was an American politician from Idaho. A member of the Democratic Party, he was the state's 27th governor and was in office for 10 years, from 1977 to 1987.

Biography
Born in Malad, Idaho, Evans was an infantryman in the U.S. Army during World War II. Following the war, he attended Stanford University and graduated in 1951. He and his wife, Lola Daniels Evans (1927–2015), were married for over 69 years and had five children: three sons and two daughters.

Career
Evans returned to Malad after college to help run the family wheat and cattle ranch. He was elected to the state senate at age 27 in 1952 and re-elected in 1954 and 1956, serving as majority leader in his final term. In 1960, Evans became mayor of Malad City and served in that capacity until 1966. He returned to the state senate in 1969 and served as minority leader from 1969 to 1975.

Evans was elected lieutenant governor in 1974, and became governor in January 1977 when Cecil Andrus accepted an appointment to become the Secretary of the Interior in the new Carter administration.

Evans finished Andrus' term and was elected governor in his own right in 1978, defeating Republican house speaker Allan Larsen of Blackfoot. , Evans remains the only Mormon to have won election as governor in Idaho. Arnold Williams was the Mormon first to serve as governor (succeeding to the office following the resignation of Charles Gossett), holding office for slightly over a year starting in late 1945, but lost the 1946 election.

Evans was re-elected in 1982, narrowly defeating Republican lieutenant governor Phil Batt of Wilder in a contest so close on election night that at least one Idaho television network incorrectly declared Batt the winner.

After nearly a decade as a governor, Evans unsuccessfully ran for the U.S. Senate in 1986, but was defeated by Republican incumbent Steve Symms of Caldwell. He was succeeded as governor by Andrus, who served two more terms, giving the Democrats six consecutive elections for governor in the state, holding the office from 1971 to 1995.

While he was in office as governor in 1981, Evans's 29-year-old son John was the target of a foiled kidnapping attempt in Burley.

Elections

Later life and death
Evans became president of the family-owned D. L. Evans Bank in Burley in January 1987, which was founded in 1904 in Albion by his grandfather, David Lloyd Evans, Sr. (1854–1929). Evans died at age 89 in 2014 at his Boise home on July 8. Less than year later, his widow Lola died at home in Boise on May 19, 2015, at the age of 88. They are interred at the Malad City Cemetery in Malad City.

References

External links
 National Governors Association
 D.L. Evans Bank
 

|-

|-

|-

1925 births
2014 deaths
American bank presidents
Latter Day Saints from Idaho
Businesspeople from Idaho
Democratic Party governors of Idaho
Democratic Party Idaho state senators
Lieutenant Governors of Idaho
Mayors of places in Idaho
People from Burley, Idaho
People from Malad City, Idaho
Military personnel from Idaho
Stanford University alumni
20th-century American businesspeople